Kevin Grant Sharp (December 10, 1970 – April 19, 2014) was an American country music singer, author, and motivational speaker. Sharp came on the country music scene in 1996 with his first single: a cover of Tony Rich's "Nobody Knows", which topped the Billboard country chart for four weeks. The same year, Sharp released his first album, Measure of a Man. Having survived a form of bone cancer in his teenage years, Sharp became actively involved in the Make-A-Wish Foundation. He wrote an inspirational book about his life and his fight with cancer, and occasionally toured the United States as a motivational speaker. Sharp died from complications of stomach surgery in April 2014.

Biography

Early years
Kevin Grant Sharp was born December 10, 1970 in Redding, California. When he was seven years old, his family moved to Weiser, Idaho, to open a restaurant. Sharp performed in local musicals in high school, and stayed active in music after his family moved to Sacramento, California, in 1985. Starting in 1989, he began to experience dizziness and fatigue. He was diagnosed with Ewing's sarcoma, a rare form of bone cancer. Kevin Sharp was given little chance of recovery. Through the Make-A-Wish Foundation, which grants wishes to children with life-threatening illnesses, Sharp met the record producer David Foster, with whom he soon became friends. After two years of chemotherapy and radiation treatment, when still in his early 20s, the cancer went into remission by the early 1990s, although he permanently lost all of his hair as a result of the radiation treatment. In high school Kevin played football and basketball. He was unable to play football and basketball during his senior year because of his cancer. The doctors eventually discovered that the cancer had spread to his lungs. Kevin Sharp was a member of the Church of Jesus Christ of Latter-day Saints. Kevin Sharp graduated from Bella Vista High School.

Musical career
After remission, Sharp worked at Great America in Santa Clara, California, while working on a demo tape, which he sent to various talent shows, and later to David Foster. Foster introduced him to A&R representatives and, by 1996, Sharp was signed to Asylum Records. His first album, Measure of a Man, was released in September 1996. The album's first single, a cover version of the R&B artist Tony Rich's "Nobody Knows", spent four weeks at number one on the Billboard Hot Country Singles & Tracks chart. He became a spokesperson for the Make-A-Wish Foundation, and was awarded the foundation's Wish Granter of the Year award, in 1997. He was named New Touring Artist of the Year by the Country Music Association and nominated for Top New Male Vocalist award by the Academy of Country Music.

In 1998, Sharp collapsed backstage at the TNN Music City News Country Awards, and was rushed to the hospital for emergency surgery, due to problems with steel rods in his hip. As a result, he had to cancel several tour dates. Measure of a Man produced two more top 10 country singles, "She's Sure Taking It Well" and "If You Love Somebody". The album's fourth single, "There's Only You", peaked at No. 43. His second album, Love Is, released in 1998 on Asylum, failed to produce any successful singles, and Sharp was dropped from Asylum's roster.

Sharp continued to perform as a musician, as well as a motivational speaker, and was also a spokesperson for the Make-A-Wish Foundation. Sharp wrote a book, Tragedy's Gift, and published it in 2004. His third album, Make a Wish, was released on the independent Cupit Records label in 2005, although none of its four singles charted.

Death
Sharp died on April 19, 2014, at the age of 43, of complications from stomach surgeries and digestive issues. He was survived by his mother Elaine Sharp, his ex-wife Traci Williams Sharp, and his siblings Lisa, Mary, Ron, Greg, Richard, Larry, and Genni. Kevin was preceded in death by his father, Glen Sharp, in 2009. Sharp never re-married.

Discography

Studio albums

Singles

Music videos

References

External links

1970 births
2014 deaths
20th-century American singers
21st-century American singers
American country singer-songwriters
American male singer-songwriters
American motivational speakers
Asylum Records artists
Country musicians from California
Country musicians from Idaho
People from Redding, California
People from Weiser, Idaho
Singer-songwriters from California
20th-century American male singers
21st-century American male singers
American Latter Day Saints
Singer-songwriters from Idaho